Trzaska - is a Polish Coat of Arms. It was used by several szlachta families in the times of the Polish–Lithuanian Commonwealth.

History
During a battle around the turn of the eleventh century, enemy forces rushed towards King Boleslaw I The Brave of Poland. One of the King's knights rushed to the aid of the king, but as he struck the enemy his sword broke near hilt. The King gave the knight his sword, with which the knight fought off the enemy, but near the end of the fight, that sword too broke near the hilt. After the battle, the knight returned the sword to King Boleslaw. For his courage, the knight received a shield from the King exhibiting two broken swords and a crescent moon.

The house name Trzaska (root word Polish: "trzaskać". Trzaska literally means, he who hits hard or slams.  The name was given to the knight after the king noticed the powerful blows that broke both the knight's swords and the enemies shields.

The King also gave the knight a monastery in Lublin, where members of the knight's house ruled the abbots for three generations. The monastery to this day uses the Trzaska shields as its seal. The alternate names for Trzaska (Lubiewa and Lubiewo) are derived from the name of Lublin, a city in Lesser Poland.

Blazon
"Azure, two swords Argent in pale hilted and pommeled Or, conjoined at the blade's midpoint and debruised of a crescent at a fess point, also Or. For a crest, a panache of peacock plumes, all proper, charged with the arms of the shield."
There is a new moon, as it were, not full, with both ends upward, yellow in a blue field, and two chipped sword pommels with crosses and hilts, of which one is in the middle of the moon, and the other beneath it. On a helmet above a crown is a peacock's tail, with the same moon and pommels.

Note:
That is how Paprocki described it in his Gniazdo cnoty (Nest of Virtue), pages 45 and 1187, and in O herbach (Of Clan Shields), page 265; also Okolski in vol.3, page 240, and in Klejnoty (Crests), page 87.

Notable bearers
Notable bearers of this Coat of Arms include: 
 Agenor Gołuchowski (father)
 Agenor Maria Gołuchowski

See also
 Polish heraldry
 Heraldry
 Coat of Arms

References

External links
  
  

Trzaska